Kjell Nilsson (born 4 April 1962) is a Swedish former cyclist. He competed in the individual road race event at the 1984 Summer Olympics.

References

External links
 

1962 births
Living people
Swedish male cyclists
Olympic cyclists of Sweden
Cyclists at the 1984 Summer Olympics
Sportspeople from Örebro